The Purdue "All-American" Marching Band (or AAMB) is the marching band of Purdue University and the main source of auxiliary entertainment for Purdue Boilermakers football games.  The AAMB is also the official band of the Indianapolis 500 race, having held the position since 1919.  The band has grown from an original 5 members to 389 members.  The three most distinctive features of the AAMB are the Purdue Big Bass Drum, the Purdue Golden Girl featured twirler, and the "Block P," the first marching band field formation created in 1907.

History and Traditions

In 1886 the Purdue Student Army Training Corps formed a five-member drum corps to play music for the cadets during their morning conditioning marches.  While operating without a director until 1904, the band had started playing at Purdue football games and had grown to over 50 members.  However, during this time it played sporadically, as there was no consistent director.  Additionally, the band received almost no training and had to provide most of their own equipment.

The band's modern history began when in 1904, Paul Spotts Emrick, a freshman from Rochester, joined the band.  His experience as a conductor resulted in his election as band president and director the next year.  During his senior year at Purdue in 1907, the band became the first to break ranks and form a letter on the field—the famous Block "P". In a 1953 interview with the Lafayette Journal & Courier, Emrick recounted seeing geese fly over a lake in the fall, saying "usually, they'd fly in a 'V', but once in a while, they'd change formation and fly in various figures. I used to wonder if you could do that with men drilling." The "Block P" has been performed during each pre-game performance ever since its inception.

Emrick stayed on as full-time director after his graduation in 1908.  In 1921 Emrick commissioned the Leedy Manufacturing Company of Indianapolis to construct the world's largest bass drum.  The "Big Bass Drum" has been a part of the marching band ever since.  In 1935, during a Purdue football game at Northwestern University the band donned lights on their uniforms while performing at halftime.  With the stadium lights turned off for the performance, the band drew such awe from radio broadcaster Ted Husing, he referred to them as a "truly All-American marching band," hence the current title of the band.

Emrick retired in 1954, and to date the band has been under the direction of just five other men:
 Dr. Al G. Wright (1954–1981)
 William C. Moffit (1981–1988)
 Joseph Manfredo (1988-1989)
 Dr. David A. Leppla (1989–2006)
 Jay S. Gephart (July 1, 2006 – present)

Second director Al Wright added many "show band" traditions to the "All-American" Marching Band. He increased the size of the band, added baton twirlers, and changed the uniform to its current look. Wright built upon the patriotism suggested in the "All-American" name of the band by creating the "I Am An American" speech. This speech is read during each pre-game performance while the band plays America the Beautiful.

Wright greatly increased the visibility of the "All-American" Marching Band across the world by taking the band to perform in many countries including Canada, Holland, Germany, Iceland, Japan, Colombia, and Venezuela during the 1960s and 1970s. This tradition of international travel continues today, with other notable trips including an invitation from the Chinese government to perform in international cultural activities that lead up to the 2008 Beijing Summer Olympics. In both 2012 and 2018 the Band also traveled to Ireland for the Saint Patrick's Day Parade in Dublin. In 2015, the AAMB traveled to Medellin, Colombia for the Feria de las Flores.

In 1995 the "All-American" Marching Band was the recipient of the Sudler Trophy, the most prestigious award a college marching band can receive.  Currently, the "All-American" Marching Band is the only band from a university without a school of music to have received this award.

Featured Twirlers

The Purdue band is also famous for its four Featured Twirler positions: the Golden Girl, the Girl in Black, and the Silver Twins.

Purdue's Golden Girl ranks among the nation's best twirlers and is at the top of her art form. This talented performer is selected by audition each April, and serves as a leader of the AAMB as well as an ambassador for Purdue University. Recognized nationally for her unique talents, this coveted position has roots going back to the early history of Purdue Bands. The tradition of the Golden Girl was begun in 1954 during the era of quarterback Len Dawson, whose poise on the field prompted the press to nickname him Purdue's "Golden Boy." At the same time, Dr. Al G. Wright (now Director of Bands Emeritus) brought his first twirling protégé to the field, Juanita Carpenter, who earned the title of "Golden Girl." When Dawson graduated Purdue was left without a Golden Boy, but Carpenter's graduation didn't have the same effect on her title. Instead Golden Girl evolved into a movable crown that's been passed down through generations, and the position has become the standard for excellence within the twirling community. Golden Girl #30 is Kaitlyn Schleis from Oshkosh, WI. .

In 1962, another solo twirler position was created to complement the Golden Girl. June Ciampa was the first to fill this position. Dressed in Purdue's other color, black, she first performed as the International Twirler. This title was later replaced with "Girl in Black." The current Girl in Black is Amanda Coy from Saline, MI.

Alexis Piskulic and Brooke Wyatt from Arnold, MO and LaFontaine, IN, respectively take on a special role as novelty "Silver Twins" twirlers for the Purdue "All-American" Marching Band. The position of Silver Twins was created by Al G. Wright in 1960 for identical twins, and has since been filled by both twins and look-a-likes.

In 2018, the position of Miss Boilerette was added based on the excited growth of the twirling program. The title of Miss Boilerette is currently held by Alicia Dennie from Culver, IN.

Marching band pioneers
The Purdue "All-American" Marching Band has pioneered a number of accomplishments. It was the first marching band to:

 Break ranks on a football field to make a formation (The "Block P"), 1907
 Carry the colors of the Big Ten, 1919
 Play opposing school fight song, 1920
 Wear their hats backwards after a conference victory
 Perform at Radio City Music Hall, 1963
 Receive an official performance invitation from China, 2008
 Lead the Macy's Thanksgiving Day Parade from the Big Ten, 2010

Band composition

The AAMB contains numerous woodwind, brass, percussion, and auxiliary members.  In parade and block formation the wind instruments are organized into ranks of 10 people. Each rank contains a rank leader (the "1") and an assistant rank leader (the "10"). The band currently contains 26 ranks of wind instruments. The percussion section consists of a drumline, two drum majors, and the World's Largest Drum along with its crew. Auxiliary performers are organized by their performance type. In addition, a section of fourteen Big Ten Flag carriers march with the band in parade and on the field.

 Woodwind Instruments
 Piccolos
 Clarinets
 Alto Saxophones
 Tenor Saxophones
 Brass Instruments
 Trumpets
 Mellophones
 Trombones
 Bass Trombones
 Baritone horns
 Sousaphones
 Percussion
 Snare Drums
 Tenor Drums
 Bass Drums
 Cymbals
 Drum Majors
 World's Largest Drum (Big Bass Drum)
 Auxiliaries
 All-American Twirlers (Majorette Line)
 Golden Silks (Flag Corps)
 Goldusters (Dancers/Pom Squad)
 The Big Ten Flags
 Feature Twirlers
 Golden Girl
 Girl in Black
 Miss Boilerette
 Silver Twins

Auditions
To gain admission to the "All-American" Marching Band each student must audition every year. Previous years membership does not guarantee a position in the band. Auditions are composed of a music audition followed by a week of marching auditions prior to the first week of classes. Student Leaders for each instrument section are selected by band staff to aid in the teaching of Purdue band marching fundamentals including the Big Ten conference's ubiquitous chair step.

Notable alumni
 Neil Armstrong, astronaut, aviator, first man on the Moon. Armstrong played baritone horn with the AAMB in 1952. Armstrong was made an honorary member of Kappa Kappa Psi in 1965 and received the band department's Alumni Achievement Award in 1997. His Kappa Kappa Psi pin went with him to the Moon and is now on display at Purdue's Edward C. Elliott Hall of Music.
 Orville Redenbacher, businessman and agriculturalist, namesake of Orville Redenbacher's Gourmet Popping Corn. Redenbacher played tuba with the band in the 1920s.
 Russell Games Slayter, inventor of fiberglass. Slayter was a tuba player. The Slayter Center of Performing Arts, the site of the band's "Thrill on the Hill" football pep rallies, is a gift from Slayter and his wife.

References

External links
 

Big Ten Conference marching bands
Purdue University
Musical groups from Indiana
Musical groups established in 1886
1886 establishments in Indiana